Eurynome aspera, the strawberry crab, is a species of crab in the family Majidae.It is small (1–2 cm) and sometimes a vague strawberry colour. The carapace and legs are often encrusted with algae and mud which act as camouflage.

Range
The East Atlantic, Mediterranean Sea and South Africa.

Description
The rostrum is bipartite, forming a double point. The two points are widely separated, each broad at the base and tapering forwards. The postorbital spine is laterally expanded and the antorbital spine is absent. Many areas of the carapace have tubercles. The second and third peduncular segments of the antenna are broad and the eyestalks retract. The chelipeds are equal in size and those of the female are shorter and less developed than in the male. The body and legs are pale red to brown, occasionally blue-grey, and the tubercles (warts) are white or brown. This species has been confused with Eurynome spinosa See Hartnoll, 1961 (references),

Habitat
Depth range - lower shore to 180 metres.

References
Ingle, R.W., 1997 Shallow-water Crabs. Series Synopses of the British Fauna Field Studies Council. 
M.J. de Kluijver & S.S. Ingalsuo Macrobenthos of the North Sea - Crustacea
R.G. Hartnoll, 1961 A Re-Examination of the Spider Crab Eurynome Leach From British Waters
Crustaceana, Volume 2, Issue 3, pages 171 – 182 DOI: 10.1163/156854061X00149

Majoidea